Aldobrandesca (also known as Aldo, Alda, Aude, Blanca, and Bruna) (1249, Siena, Italy – 1309) was an Italian saint, mystic, and nurse.

When Aldobrandesca was a young woman, her parents arranged a marriage for her, which she reluctantly agreed to, but she grew to love her husband, anyway.  He died young, leaving her with no children, but she chose to remain celibate, dedicate herself to prayer, and give away all her belongings.  She joined the Humiliati, an Italian religious order of women that worked with the poor and the ill.  She also felt called to reform prostitutes and "the fallen".  It was reported that she wore a hair shirt to make penance for her erotic memories of her husband, which seemed to work, although she made "ever more extreme bodily penances" to deal with the temptation.

She was "greatly honoured" in Siena and called "a popular curiosity in the town" due to her many reported miracles, ecstasies, and trances.  According to Loyola Press, she was a saint because of her charitable works, not her trances, demonstrated by her forgiveness towards a group of people who abused her during a trance, despite the excruciating pain they caused her.

She ministered to the sick and the poor, moving into the hospital in Siena towards the end of her life, "subjecting herself to great mortifications".  She is believed to have experienced ecstasies and visions, and healed at least four people.  She performed charitable works everyday, up to her death in 1309.

Her feast day is April 26.

References

14th-century Christian saints
Alda
Alda
Alda
People from Siena
Alda
Alda
Christian female saints of the Middle Ages